Młynarczyk is a Polish surname meaning a "small miller". Notable people with the surname include:

 Henryk Młynarczyk (born 1955), Polish politician
 Józef Młynarczyk (born 1953), Polish footballer

Polish-language surnames
Occupational surnames